Alexander Douglas Douglas-Hamilton, 16th Duke of Hamilton, 13th Duke of Brandon (born 31 March 1978), is a Scottish nobleman and the premier peer of Scotland.

Early life
He is the son of Angus Douglas-Hamilton, 15th Duke of Hamilton, and his first wife, Sarah Scott, and was educated at Keil School, Dumbarton, and Gordonstoun in Scotland.

Inheritance
Upon the death of his father on 5 June 2010, he became the 16th Duke of Hamilton in the Peerage of Scotland and 13th Duke of Brandon in the Peerage of Great Britain. He also inherited other Scottish peerages and titles, 
Marquess of Douglas, Marquess of Clydesdale, Earl of Angus, Earl of Lanark, Earl of Arran and Cambridge,
Lord Abernethy and Jedburgh Forest,
Lord Machanshyre and Polmont and Lord Aven and Innerdale, and the Barony of Dutton in the peerage of Great Britain.

The Duke is the Hereditary Keeper of the Palace of Holyroodhouse and the hereditary bearer of the Crown of Scotland. In this role, he walks immediately before the monarch in the ancient ceremonial procession known as the Riding of Parliament.

The seat of the Dukes of Hamilton is Lennoxlove House, replacing the now-demolished Hamilton Palace.

Marriage and children 
On 7 May 2011, he married Sophie Ann Rutherford (born 8 December 1976) in Edinburgh. She is an interior designer and the daughter of Hubert A. J.  Rutherford (born 1940), of Roxburghshire, and Isabel W. Taylor (born 1943), of Edinburgh. The couple have three children.

Death of Queen Elizabeth II
On 12 September 2022, during a service of remembrance in St Giles' Cathedral, the Duke placed the Crown of Scotland upon the coffin of Queen Elizabeth II.

References 

1978 births
Living people
116
13
13
Alexander Douglas-Hamilton, 16th Duke of Hamilton
People educated at Gordonstoun
People educated at Keil School